William W. Spencer (July 28, 1921 – May 14, 2007) was an American cinematographer. He won two Primetime Emmy Awards and was nominated for one more in the category Outstanding Cinematography for his work on the television programs 12 O'Clock High, Barnaby Jones and Fame. Spencer died in May 2007 at his home in Brentwood, California, at the age of 85.

References

External links 

1921 births
2007 deaths
People from Windsor, Ontario
Canadian emigrants to the United States
American cinematographers
Canadian cinematographers
Primetime Emmy Award winners